Ian Hume-Dudgeon (21 June 1924 – 22 September 2001) was an Irish equestrian. He competed at the 1952 Summer Olympics, the 1956 Summer Olympics and the 1960 Summer Olympics.

References

External links
 

1924 births
2001 deaths
Irish male equestrians
Olympic equestrians of Ireland
Equestrians at the 1952 Summer Olympics
Equestrians at the 1956 Summer Olympics
Equestrians at the 1960 Summer Olympics
People from Sandhurst, Berkshire
Irish expatriate sportspeople in the United Kingdom